The William B. Wills House, commonly known as Sipsey, is a historic house in Eutaw, Alabama. The one-story wood-frame house was built c. 1835. It is built in the Greek Revival style, atop a high brick foundation. A pedimented Doric portico spans the main entrance in the center of the five-bay main facade. It was added to the National Register of Historic Places on September 22, 1983.

References

National Register of Historic Places in Greene County, Alabama
Houses on the National Register of Historic Places in Alabama
Houses in Greene County, Alabama
Houses completed in 1835
Greek Revival houses in Alabama
Relocated buildings and structures in Alabama